Brad Hawkins (born July 26, 1998) is an American football safety for the New England Patriots of the National Football League (NFL). He played college football at Michigan.

High school
Hawkins attended MetEast High School before transferring to Camden High School, where he was a multi-sport athlete, playing basketball along with football before graduating in 2016 and going on to do a post-graduate year at Suffield Academy.

College career
Hawkins played for five years for Michigan, appearing in a program-record 56 games, with 31 starts at the free safety position. He was a third-team all-Big Ten selection in 2021.

Professional career

Atlanta Falcons
After going undrafted in the 2022 NFL draft, Hawkins signed with the Atlanta Falcons as a free agent. He was cut by the Falcons on July 6, 2022.

New England Patriots
A month later, Hawkins signed with the New England Patriots. Though primarily signed for practice squad use, he played in the Patriots three preseason games. He was cut from the team on October 3, 2022. He signed a reserve/future contract on January 10, 2023.

References

External links
 Michigan Wolverines bio

1998 births
Living people
American football defensive backs
Camden High School (New Jersey) alumni
New England Patriots players
Michigan Wolverines football players
Players of American football from New Jersey
Sportspeople from Camden, New Jersey